The Nonmotorized Transportation Pilot Program (NTPP) was created in 2005 as part of a six-year United States federal government transportation bill called SAFETEA-LU. According to the law,  It provides $21.5 million to each of four communities: Columbia, Missouri; Marin County, California; Minneapolis-Saint Paul, Minnesota; and Sheboygan County, Wisconsin. It will explore how these communities can increase rates of nonmotorized transportation by 2010 through investments in planning, infrastructure, and public education. The communities will also study how these investments will impact traffic congestion, energy use, health, and the environment.

The Minneapolis-St. Paul program, launched in 2007 as Bike/Walk Twin Cities, is administered by Transit for Livable Communities, a nonprofit organization. The third round of funding for Bike/Walk Twin Cities projects occurred in 2009 and included $1.75 million for Nice Ride Minnesota, a Minneapolis bike-sharing program,  and $524,000 for a University of Minnesota Bike Center.

Between 2007 and 2013, pedestrian trips increased by 22.8% and bicycle trips increased by 48.3% across all four communities. An estimated 85.1 million vehicle miles traveled were averted between 2009 and 2013. The communities also observed an increase in safety with a 20% decrease in pedestrian fatalities and a 28.6% decrease in bicycle fatalities between 2002 and 2012.

Notes

References
Bicycle and Pedestrian Provisions in (SAFETEA-LU) not Codified in Title 23 (Sec. 1807)
Transit for Livable Communities Minneapolis NTP Info
Nonmotorized transportation pilot program : continued progress in developing walking and bicycling networks - May 2014

External links 
Marin County Bike Coalition NTP Info
Bike/Walk Twin Cities
Report to the U.S. Congress on the Outcomes of NTPP

2005 in American law
United States federal transportation legislation
Federal assistance in the United States